Bollinger Shipyards is an American constructor of ships, workboats and patrol vessels.
Its thirteen shipyards and forty drydocks are located in Louisiana and Texas. Its drydocks range in capacity from vessels of 100 tons displacement to 22,000 tons displacement. The firm was founded in 1946.

Coast Guard vessels

The United States Coast Guard has called upon Bollinger Shipyards to build many of its patrol vessels.

Marine Protector cutters

Bollinger secured the contract to build approximately fifty Marine Protector cutters.
These  vessels were staffed by a crew of 10.  Uniquely for Coast Guard vessels of this size they were designed to be capable of being crewed by crews of mixed sex.  These high speed vessels were lightly armed, mounting just two Browning M2 fifty caliber machine guns.  But they were equipped with a stern launching ramp, capable of launching and retrieving a high speed pursuit boat while the cutter was still in motion.  The launch and retrieval of the pursuit boat required just one sailor to remain on deck.

Over 70 vessels were constructed, before the production line was shut down, with 4 being built for other nations, and 4 being built for the United States Navy, although those vessels are manned and operated by the Coast Guard.

Island-class cutters

Bollinger originally built 49   cutters, so called because each cutter was named after an island.  These vessels were staffed by a crew of 18, and their primary armament was a 25 mm autocannon.
Bollinger secured a contract to refit eight of the Island-class cutters, adding thirteen feet to their stern, so they too could launch and retrieve a pursuit boat from a rear launching ramp.
The refit also included replacing the original deckhouse and refitting the crew accommodation so they could carry a mixed gender crew of 18. The conversion added 15 tons to each vessel.  All of the eight refitted  Island-class cutters' hulls would crack when driven at high speed in a heavy seas, and proved to be so unseaworthy that they were all withdrawn from service, forcing the scrapping of the conversion program. As a result, in August 2011, the US government sued Bollinger over the failed modifications, alleging that the company made false statements about the hull strength that would result from its extensions to the patrol boats. The suit was dismissed.

Sentinel-class cutters
On September 26, 2008, Bollinger was awarded US$88 million to build the prototype of the  fast-response cutters. In 2008, Bollinger secured a contract to build the first group of 24 to 34 cutters. On 5 May 2016  U.S. Coast Guard signed a new contract with Bollinger to build 26 additional vessels, bringing the total on order to 58 at a cost of almost $3.8 billion. A news release said that the new ships will replace ones that Bollinger built more than 30 years previously. The  240-ton vessels are staffed by a mixed-sex crew of 22, and are armed with a remote-operated Mk 38 Mod 2 25 mm autocannon and four .50 caliber crew-served Browning M2 machine guns.  These vessels can also stern launch and retrieve a high speed pursuit boat, without coming to a stop.  They were designed for missions of five days.
The first three vessels were launched in 2011, and as of mid-2017 23 had entered service, with deliveries occurring every 73 days.

Polar-class icebreakers

Bollinger was one of five contractors which bid to build new heavy polar icebreakers for the United States Coast Guard.  The five bidders were each awarded a $20 million contract for development work.  Bollinger announced that, if it were the winning bidder, it would have built the icebreakers in its Tampa, Florida shipyard, which it predicted would have employed 1,000 workers for ten years. However, the vessels were awarded to VT Halter Marine.

United States Navy vessels

Cyclone-class patrol ships

Bollinger built 14 s for the U.S. Navy between 1993 and 2000. Their mission is coastal patrol and interdiction surveillance. These ships can also provide full mission support for Navy SEALs and other special operations forces. As of 2010, four of these vessels have been decommissioned in the Navy. Three had been loaned to the Coast Guard to fill patrol hours but have been returned to the USN as of October 2011. one vessel, PC-1, was transferred to the Philippine Navy, as an excess defense article.

As of 2015, ten of the U.S. Navy's thirteen Cyclone-class patrol ships were deployed to the Persian Gulf to deal with a potential conflict with Iran. The remaining three ships of the class are slated to be transferred to Naval Station Mayport in Florida to work primarily with drug interdiction work with U.S. Naval Forces Southern Command (USNAVSO) / U.S. Fourth Fleet.

Navajo-class rescue and salvage ship 

On 19 April 2021, Bollinger bought the contract to build seven U.S. Navy  from Gulf Island Fabrication. Included in the deal was the shipyard Houma, Louisiana where the ships were being built. The first three ships were still under construction at the time of sale.

References

External links
Official Website

Shipbuilding companies of the United States
Manufacturing companies established in 1946
1946 establishments in Louisiana
Manufacturing companies based in Louisiana